A list of films produced in Egypt in 1946. For an A-Z list of films currently on Wikipedia, see :Category:Egyptian films.

External links
 Egyptian films of 1946 at the Internet Movie Database
 Egyptian films of 1946 elCinema.com

Lists of Egyptian films by year
1946 in Egypt
Lists of 1946 films by country or language